No Man of Her Own is a 1950 American film noir drama directed by Mitchell Leisen and featuring Barbara Stanwyck, John Lund, Phyllis Thaxter, Jane Cowl and Lyle Bettger. The production is the second film Stanwyck made with director Mitchell Leisen, and its screenplay was adapted from Cornell Woolrich's 1948 novel I Married a Dead Man. Woolrich is cited in the film's opening credits by one of his commonly used pseudonyms, "William Irish".

Plot
Helen Ferguson, filled with dread, holds her baby as Bill Harkness reads a book. The phone rings, and police tell Bill that they are on the way to their home. She puts the child to bed, praying that the boy will not suffer for her mistakes and whispering that she was desperate.

A year earlier in New York, Helen is eight months pregnant, unmarried, and broke. She goes to her unfaithful boyfriend Stephen Morley, tearfully pleading for help as she stands in the hallway outside his apartment door. He refuses to answer, but slips under the door an envelope for her, one containing a five-dollar bill and a one-way train ticket to San Francisco. Retrieving the envelope, Helen pulls out the ticket, causing the money to fall to the floor, unseen. Helen, humiliated and exhausted, realizes she has no choice but to go to the station and board the train. Helen's train later crashes during the journey, and when she is found by authorities in the wreckage, she is mistaken for another pregnant woman, Patrice Harkness, who was killed in the crash. Helen gives birth to her child in the hospital and is accepted by the Harknesses, the family of the dead woman's husband, Hugh Harkness, who was also killed in the train crash. Since the family has never seen their son's new wife, they believe Helen to be her and, for the sake of her child, she does not reveal her true identity. The family decides her lapses of memory and uncertain behavior are aftereffects of the train wreck. With a better life provided for her son, Helen continues the ruse while Bill Harkness, who is the elder brother of the deceased Hugh, falls in love with her.

Helen's ex-boyfriend, the father of her child, tracks her down several months after the accident. Stephen was called in to identify the body at the morgue after the train accident, but instead of telling the truth, he said that the dead woman was Helen. After figuring out that she is living under an assumed identity and that she has wealthy in-laws, he blackmails Helen into giving him a check for $500 and marrying him. She gets a gun, goes to Stephen's office, where he is living, and finds him dead on his bed but fires the gun at him. Bill comes to the office and helps Helen dispose of the body and conceal evidence of her relationship with Stephen. Bill and his mother have realized that Helen is in trouble and, because they love her regardless of her past, will do anything they can to protect her.

Bill's mother dies of heart failure, but not before writing a letter that she gives to her maid, making her swear to give it to Helen only if police come for her. In the letter, Mrs. Harkness claims to have killed Stephen, which she could not have done. Three months later, when police find his body and the check Helen gave to him, they do come for her. Helen confesses to shooting him, but she is told that her bullet missed him and was found in his mattress, that a bullet of another caliber was found in his body, and that his girlfriend has confessed to shooting him. Bill and Helen embrace.

Cast

Credited

 Barbara Stanwyck as Helen Ferguson
 John Lund as Bill Harkness
 Jane Cowl as Mrs. Harkness
 Phyllis Thaxter as Patrice Harkness
 Lyle Bettger as Stephen Morley
 Henry O'Neill as Mr. Harkness
 Richard Denning as Hugh Harkness
 Carole Mathews as Blonde
 Harry Antrim as Ty Winthrop
 Catherine Craig as Rosalie Baker
 Esther Dale as Josie
 Milburn Stone as Plainclothesman
 Griff Barnett as Dr. Parker
 Mary Lawrence as Lucy Hunt

Uncredited

 Georgia Backus as Nurse 
 Virginia Brissac as Justice of the Peace's Wife 
 Kathleen Freeman as Clara Larrimore 
 Helen Mowery as Harriet Olsen

Reception

In his May 4, 1950 review of the film for The New York Times, Bosley Crowther generally compliments the principal cast's performances, but he pans both the structure and tone of the screenplay itself:

The widely read entertainment trade paper Variety was far more upbeat in its review. After previewing the film in Hollywood on February 17, 1950two and a half months prior to the feature's national releasethe critic for Variety endorsed the film and drew special attention to the quality of Stanwyck's and Lund's performances and to the overall quality of the motion picture's production values:Lionel Collier of Picturegoer reviewed the film positively. "The pot-boiler is extremely well acted and its clever cast, headed by attractive and talented Barbara Stanwyck, enables it to confound the moralists and prove that two or more wrongs an make a right, while, at the same time, handing out moving and occasionally gripping screen fiction. See it by all means, but fight shy of the heroine's way of life".

Adaptations
The film is based on the novel I Married a Dead Man, which was also adapted for a variety of other screen productions, including the Japanese film Shisha to no Kekkon (1960), the Brazilian TV miniseries A Intrusa (1962), the Bollywood movie Kati Patang (1970), the French film J'ai épousé une ombre (1983), and by Hollywood again for Mrs. Winterbourne (1996) starring Shirley MacLaine, Ricki Lake and Brendan Fraser.

See also
 List of American films of 1950

References

External links

Streaming audio
 No Man of Her Own on the Screen Directors Playhouse: September 21, 1951

1950 films
1950 drama films
American black-and-white films
Film noir
Films directed by Mitchell Leisen
Paramount Pictures films
Films based on American novels
Films based on works by Cornell Woolrich
Films scored by Hugo Friedhofer
American drama films
1950s English-language films
1950s American films